, released in North America as Cleopatra's Fortune, is a 1995 arcade puzzle game created by Taito in association with Natsume.

Gameplay
The gameplay is similar to Tetris in which the player has to direct blocks of stone, mummy and/or treasure to create closures which eliminates the treasure and adds to the player's score. Also if a full line of stone blocks, treasure blocks or mummy blocks is formed they will disappear in a similar fashion to Tetris and also add to the player's score.

Release
The game was initially released in late 1995 for the Taito X-55, a home karaoke machine that was able to download music and games over a phone line. An arcade port was released the following year, followed by a PlayStation version and a Sega Saturn version that were released in Japan, along with a Dreamcast version in 2001. The PlayStation and Dreamcast versions were developed and published by Altron and feature redrawn graphics and a remixed soundtrack. The PlayStation version was released in the U.S. in 2003, while the original arcade game was included in Taito Memories Jōkan for the PlayStation 2 in 2005, and Taito Legends 2 for PlayStation 2, Xbox and Microsoft Windows in 2006. An arcade-only sequel called Cleopatra Fortune Plus was released in 2002 on the Sega NAOMI system. It was created in association with Altron instead of Natsume. A port published by City Connection and based on the Saturn version titled Cleopatra Fortune S-Tribute was released for PlayStation 4, Xbox One, Nintendo Switch and Windows on November 23, 2022.

References

External links

1995 video games
Arcade video games
Cultural depictions of Cleopatra
Dreamcast games
Mobile games
PlayStation (console) games
PlayStation 4 games
Xbox One games
Nintendo Switch games
Windows games
Puzzle video games
Sega Saturn games
Square Enix franchises
Altron games
Video games based on Egyptian mythology
Video games set in Egypt
Taito arcade games
Taito F3 System games
Video games developed in Japan